Devlin may refer to:

 Devlin (surname)
 Devlin (given name)
 Devlin (rapper), a British rapper
 Devlin (TV series), a 1974 animated TV series by Hanna-Barbera
 Devlin, a 1988 novel by Roderick Thorp
 The Devil and Max Devlin, a 1981 American film starring Elliott Gould and Bill Cosby
 Devlin, a character in Harold Pinter's 1996 play Ashes to Ashes
 Devlin (album), a compilation album by American guitarist Tony Rice, released in 1987
 Devlin (Lord)

See also